Aura-Aura Climber is an arcade action video game developed and published by Nintendo for the Nintendo DSi's DSiWare digital download service. It was released on February 22, 2010.

Overview
Aura-Aura Climber revolves around a fallen star called an "Aura-Aura" climbing back up into the sky. It does this by slinging its arm around pegs in the sky. Along the way, the player can collect items like bombs and extensions. The different modes of play include score attack, and endless. Players also dodge storms, hit switches, and collect bonuses.

Reception
IGN's Lucas M. Thomas rated it 8/10, calling it "a nifty little design that's definitely helping redeem all those trashy releases still taking up the rest of the spots in the DSi Shop's 200 Point section." Eurogamer's Kristan Reed rated it 8/10, stating "Presented with all the audio-visual charm, there's much to admire", but "with only 10 levels, it's not a game destined to last long in the memory."

References

External links
Official American website

2010 video games
DSiWare games
Nintendo DS-only games
Nintendo DS games
Action video games
Nintendo games
Video games developed in the United States

Video games scored by James Phillipsen
Video games produced by Kensuke Tanabe